Gustaf Banér (May 19, 1547 – March 20, 1600) was a Swedish noble, member of the Privy Council of Sweden.

Life
Gustaf Axelsson Banér was born at Djursholm Castle, the son of the Privy Counselor Axel Nilsson and Margareta Pedersdotter (Bielke). Gustaf Banér studied at the University of Rostock, took part in the insurgence against King Eric XIV and he was appointed member of the Privy Council in 1569 by King John III. He was implicated in the Mornay plot, but not investigated for it.

He remained favoured by King John for a long time and was entrusted with several diplomatic missions, such as the royal election in Poland, in 1587, when King John's son Sigismund III was elected.

He was stadtholder in Reval between 1588 and 1590, where there was a meeting in 1589 during which there was a rupture between Banér and the members of the privy council on the one side and King John III on the other.

In 1592, when Sigismund III had succeeded John III as the king of Sweden, Banér initially supported Duke Charles in his power struggle against Sigismund. Banér's ambition was to ensure more power for the high nobility in the government. When the duke's actions had led to a rupture with most of the members of the Privy council, Banér escaped to Denmark from where he tried to incite a Swedish rebellion.

He joined King Sigismund III upon his arrival in Sweden in 1598, but after the Battle of Stångebro, Banér was handed over to King Charles. Banér was one of five noblemen sentenced to death and executed in Linköping. This event, at the main square of Linköping on March 20, 1600, became known as the Linköping Bloodbath.

Personal life
He was married on October 8, 1581, to  Kristina Svantesdotter Sture (1559–1619), daughter of the Privy Councilor and Riksmarsalken, Svante Sture the Younger (1517–1567). Her mother was Märta Erikdotter Leijonhufvud and thus she was a first cousin to King Eric XIV, King John III and King Charles IX of Sweden. Gustav and Kristina had a total of 14 children. However, four died before reaching adulthood:

 Margareta Gustafsdotter Banér ( (1582–1618)
 Svante Gustafsson Banér(1584–1628). Privy Councilor and Governor of Riga
 Anna Gustafsdotter Banér (1585–1656)
 Martha Gustafsdotter Banér (1586–1586)
 Axel Gustafsson Banér (1587–1594)
 Per (Peder) Gustafsson Banér (1588–1644)
 Nils Gustafsson Banér (1589–1614)
 daughter died at birth (1590)
 Sigrid Gustafsdotter Banér (1592–1669)
 Martha Gustafsdotter Banér (1593–1638)
 Axel Gustafsson Banér (1594–1642). Privy Councilor and Reichsmarshal
 Johan Gustafsson Banér (1596–1641). Privy Councilor and Field Marshal
 Erik Gustafsson Banér (1597–1597)
 Karl Gustafsson Banér (1598–1632). State Secretary, Deputy Governor of Prussia

References

Other sources
 The article Banér, Gustaf in Nationalencyklopedin (1990)

1547 births
1600 deaths
People executed by Sweden by decapitation
Swedish nobility
16th-century Swedish politicians
17th-century executions by Sweden
People from Danderyd Municipality
Executed Swedish people
People of the War against Sigismund